The Teatro Comunale Alessandro Bonci (Alessandro Bonci Theatre)  is an opera house in Cesena, Italy.

The Bonci Theatre was built on the site of the old Spada Theatre starting in August 1843 on a design by the architect Vincenzo Ghinelli and was opened on 15 August 1846.

It distinguished itself immediately with the best dramatic and lyric opera productions, a fact confirmed by the presence of leading performers of the period. It was dedicated to the great tenor from Cesena Alessandro Bonci after his performances of 1904 and 1927. Bonci was born in Cesena on 10 February 1870.

The theater is a member of the Italian route section of the European Route of Historic Theatres.

References

External links

 Teatro Comunale Alessandro Bonci official website 

Alessandro Bonci
Music venues completed in 1846
Buildings and structures in Cesena
Performing arts venues in Emilia-Romagna
Theatres completed in 1846
Theatres in Emilia-Romagna
1846 establishments in the Papal States
19th-century architecture in Italy